David Gorcey (February 6, 1921 – October 23, 1984) was an American actor and the younger brother of actor Leo Gorcey. Gorcey is best known for portraying "Chuck Anderson" in Monogram Pictures' film series The Bowery Boys, and "Pee Wee" in its antecedent The East Side Kids.

Life and career
David Gorcey was born in Washington Heights, Manhattan, New York, the son of Josephine (née Condon) and Bernard Gorcey. His father was a Russian Jewish immigrant and his mother was an Irish Catholic immigrant. and entered the entertainment business at a young age. He appeared in vaudeville during his childhood, and eventually made it to the stage and screen.

When Gorcey was 10 years old, he was signed by the Vitaphone studio in New York to co-star in its Penrod and Sam series of short subjects, based on the Booth Tarkington stories. "Dave Gorcey" played Sam Williams opposite Billy Hayes as Penrod Schofield.

He is not usually thought of as one of the "original" Dead End Kids, but he did have a small role in the 1935 Broadway production of Sidney Kingsley's Dead End. During his time as a cast member of Dead End, David helped secure a role for his older brother Leo, who ultimately became a star while David remained a supporting character.

Dead End became a hit motion picture, and the street gang of the play became known as the Dead End Kids. When other studios wanted to make their own tough-kid pictures, Leo Gorcey was unavailable and expensive, so younger brother David Gorcey became a more economical second choice. David became a prolific tough-kid juvenile in such films as Juvenile Court (1938), Sergeant Madden (1939), and Carolina Moon (1940). When Universal Pictures launched its Dead End Kids knockoff The Little Tough Guys, David Gorcey was hired. He later joined brother Leo in Monogram Pictures' East Side Kids series.

His screen career was interrupted by military service. During World War II he served in the U.S. Army. Upon his return to civilian life, he was recruited by his brother Leo for Monogram's new series, now called The Bowery Boys. Beginning in 1952 David Gorcey adopted the screen name "David Condon", using his mother's maiden name to avoid accusations of nepotism. He reverted to his real name in 1957. He occasionally appeared apart from the gang, in such films as The Babe Ruth Story (1948), and Abbott and Costello in the Foreign Legion (1950).

Personal life
He was married to Dorothea Jocker (Aaron), with whom he had a son, David Jr.

David Gorcey was always pleasant and professional to his fellow cast and crew members, unlike his brother Leo who was often argumentative and abusive. In 1956, after the death of their father Bernard Gorcey, David visited Leo's home, only to find Leo in a drunken rampage. Leo threatened David with a gun, causing the appalled David to leave both the premises and Leo behind. He reluctantly became estranged from Leo.

Later in life, he became a minister ("Father David") and founded a halfway house to help recovering alcoholics and people with substance abuse problems. He died in Van Nuys, California on October 23, 1984, of complications of diabetes.

Filmography

Film

Television

References

External links
 

1921 births
1984 deaths
Male actors from New York (state)
American male film actors
American people of Irish descent
American people of Russian-Jewish descent
Jewish American male actors
People from Washington Heights, Manhattan
Vaudeville performers
20th-century American male actors
Deaths from diabetes
Burials at Los Angeles National Cemetery
20th-century American Jews